Hunan University of Chinese Medicine is a public university located in Changsha, Hunan province, China. The university offers courses in Traditional Chinese Medicine.

As of 2022, Hunan University of Chinese Medicine is ranked the best in Hunan and 32rd nationwide among Chinese Medical Universities including in the ranking.

History 
The university traces its history from Hunan Chinese Medicine Specialty School established in 1934 and Hunan TCM Vocational School established in 1953. From 1960 up to a few years after 2000, it was known as Hunan College of Traditional Chinese Medicine. The current Hunan University of Traditional Chinese Medicine was officially created and approved by the State Ministry of Education in 2006 when this TCM College had successfully merged with the former Hunan University of Science and Technology and the Hunan Academy of Traditional Chinese Medicine (research-focused). The University as it stands now, is primarily a teaching-oriented medical school, but also involved heavily in TCM research, providing health-care services to the province, and is one of the leading TCM universities in China.

On December 28, 2018, President Tan Yuansheng has been stripped of his post and party membership for alleged "serious violations of discipline and laws."

Location and Campus 
The university is based in Changsha, the capital of Hunan province.  The campus covers an area of 4701 acres or approximately 1,902,6000 square meters.

The university consists of 3 campuses : the old campus (north campus), the new campus (Hanpu campus), and seven affiliated clinical hospitals.

The university consists of 5 nursing schools.

Administration

Colleges and Departments 

The university administers the following 20 colleges or institutes: 
The College of Western medicine(MBBS)
The College of Neurology
The College of Cardiology
The College of Orthopedics
The College of Gynaecology and Obstetrics
The College of Pediatrics
The College of Basic Science
The College of Acupuncture and Massage
The College of combined Chinese and Western Medicine
The College of Pharmacy
The First College of Clinical Medicine
The Second College of Clinical medicine
The College of Culture, Information Technology and Management
International Education Institute 
Second-level College, Xianxing College
The College of Adult Education
Higher Vocational Technical College
Graduate students Department
Social Science Department
The Third College of Medicine

Rankings and reputation 
In 2018, the Best Chinese Universities Ranking, also known as the "Shanghai Ranking", ranked Hunan University of Chinese Medicine at 282nd among all Chinese universities, and as of 2022, Hunan University of Chinese Medicine ranked the best in Hunan and 32nd nationwide among Chinese Medical Universities including in the ranking.

As of 2022, Hunan University of Chinese Medicine ranked #1854 globally, #734 in Asia and #283 in China in the 2023 Best Global Universities by the U.S. News & World Report Best Global University Ranking. The university ranked # 1875 in the world out of nearly 30,000 universities worldwide by the University Rankings by Academic Performance 2021-2022.

References

External links 

Universities and colleges in Hunan
Universities and colleges in Changsha
Yuelu District